Richard Graeme Thompson (born 1 July 1984) is a former Major League Baseball relief pitcher who played for the Los Angeles Angels of Anaheim and Oakland Athletics.

Career

Los Angeles Angels of Anaheim
Thompson was originally signed as an undrafted free agent by the Anaheim Angels on 13 February .

In , he was part of the Australian Olympic baseball team, which achieved a silver medal at the Athens Olympics.

Thompson had his contract purchased by the Angels' major league club on 1 September, marking the first time he was on the major league roster. He made his major league debut on that same day against the Texas Rangers

In , Thompson began the season with the Angels after relievers Chris Bootcheck and Scot Shields began the season on the disabled list. However, after allowing five earned runs on four hits in his only outing against the Texas Rangers, Thompson was optioned to the Triple-A Salt Lake Bees to make way for Shields. He made one more appearance with the Angels, but became hurt pitching in Memphis for the Triple-A team. He spent the majority of his 2008 season rehabbing his shoulder injury in Arizona and finished the season with the Bees.

On 10 September 2010 Thompson picked up his first major league win after the Angels went into extra innings against the Seattle Mariners.

Thompson made his only Australian Baseball League appearances in the 2010–11 season pitching in three games for his native Sydney Blue Sox.

On 14 April 2012, the Angels designated Thompson for assignment.

Oakland Athletics
On 20 April 2012, the Oakland Athletics claimed him off waivers. On 25 April 2012, the Athletics designated Thompson for assignment. On 27 April 2012, the Athletics outrighted Thompson to their Triple-A affiliate Sacramento River Cats.

Toronto Blue Jays
On 11 December 2012, the Toronto Blue Jays announced that Thompson had been signed to a minor league contract with an invitation to major league spring training.

Thompson injured himself prior to breaking camp with the Blue Jays and is still listed as inactive (not released or retired) with the AAA team as of 2019.

References

External links

1984 births
2006 World Baseball Classic players
2009 World Baseball Classic players
Amherst College alumni
Arizona League Angels players
Arkansas Travelers players
Australian expatriate baseball players in the United States
Baseball players at the 2004 Summer Olympics
Cedar Rapids Kernels players
Living people
Los Angeles Angels players
Major League Baseball pitchers
Major League Baseball players from Australia
Medalists at the 2004 Summer Olympics
Oakland Athletics players
Olympic baseball players of Australia
Olympic medalists in baseball
Olympic silver medalists for Australia
Rancho Cucamonga Quakes players
Salt Lake Bees players
Sydney Blue Sox players
Sacramento River Cats players